Julio Jorge Nelson, born Isaac Rosofsky (April 27, 1913 – March 6, 1976), was a leading Argentine tango musician. He helped establish the cult of Carlos Gardel and wrote several tangos.

Biography 
Born in Buenos Aires, into a Jewish Argentine family on April 27, 1913, as Isaac Rosofsky, he became famous as an adult with the pseudonym Julio Jorge Nelson, and his nickname "La Viuda". Nelson helped establish the cult of Carlos Gardel, whom Nelson referred to as "El Bronce que Sonríe". Nelson said of Gardel that he "sings better every day".

Isaac, the son of a shoemaker, was raised in Villa Crespo. His childhood home was at 225 Triunvirato, later renumbered and renamed as 4943 Corrientes, opposite the theater Florencio Sánchez. Immersed since childhood in the theatrical environment and in the emerging world of radio, at fourteen he decided not to study further, a decision that earned him being thrown out of the house by his parents. He moved to El Centro area of Buenos Aires, where he worked in the company of notable future Argentine artists including Angelina Pagano, Rosa Rosen, Mark Zucker and Irma Córdoba.

Linking his fate to that of Gardel began in 1933 when he was presented as a performance artist speaker at the Nacional theater. In 1934 Nelson began broadcasting his Buenos Aires radio program "Escuche esta Noche a Gardel" (Listen tonight to Gardel), trying to keep alive the public's interest in Gardel. The June 24, 1935, news of the accident in Medellín killing Gardel was announced to Nelson in the coffee house "Los 36 Billares" by Francisco Canaro and José Razzano.

Soon after, on Radio Callao, opened in January of that year, the announcer Carlos Enrique Cecchetti began broadcasting a program fully devoted to Gardel, Jorge Julio Nelson continued that program beginning in 1936, inaugurating the show "El Bronce que Sonríe" (the smiling bronze). This program moved in 1944 to Radio Mitre. Each daily program started with this saying: "Through time and distance his name endures as the truest symbol of our arts. Carlos Gardel, the smiling bronze."  Nelson did not forget the morbid touch necessary for the creation of any myth, and after the repatriation of the remains of Carlos Gardel from Colombia on February 5, 1936, Nelson broadcast a program from his tomb in the Chacarita Cemetery.

Another day radio program which gave Nelson great popularity was "El Exito de Cada Orquesta" (The Success of Every Orchestra), which was broadcast from Radio Callao (the station that also directed "La Pandilla Corazón") and then transferred to Radio Mitre and finally Radio Rivadavia. Knowing the value of ritual formulae, Nelson concluded each program with the same farewell: "See you tomorrow, if God permits." It was not at all formally religious, but that sounded humble and devotional. Both programs remained stubbornly on the air long after radio stations had started to thin out their tango programming.

In 1936, he married Margarita Ibarrola Isaurralde when she was 17, but split in 1945, leaving his 7-year-old son, Julio Carlos, (Cachito) with the boy's paternal grandparents. The child clung to his grandfather and refused to let go. Margarita emigrated to Brazil, where she married a German and had two children with him: Susana Carolina and Guillermo Federico Müller, but again separated. Eventually all contact was lost. Julio then married Susana Carballo in 1951; she was a female tango singer known as Susana Ocampo. That marriage lasted only a year and half. They separated then, but no formal divorce. After the death of Julio Jorge Nelson, Susana thus became his heir.

Julio went every day to see his parents, where his son lived. His son went to the same school that Julio attended: Francisco de Victoria, at 240 Julián Álvarez. His son would visit him at Radio Mitre, at 1925 Arenales 1925, and even lived for a time with his father. But one day, at age 14, his son escaped from the grandparents' house, leaving a letter in which he explained to them that he was going south. The truth was that he was going to Guayaquil Ecuador with two friends. In Bolivia they were arrested, but managed to continue traveling on a group passport. At his destination, Julio's son found employment at Club Barcelona.  At that time, Tucho Méndez, a friendof Julio's  and aware of the disappearance of Julio's child, recognized his son with great surprise. He immediately phoned Buenos Aires, and shortly after, via a link to a radio Guayaquil, Julio, who had never shown her affection for his son asked the son to come back home. And his son did return.

Julio died on 6 March 1976, a few weeks before had left the home of his son in Martinez to settle in the Hotel Wilton, near where then was the radio station. But on March 2, he suffered a heart attack, from which he could not recover. He was admitted to the Anchorena hospital.

Although as a lyricist, Julio Jorge Nelson wrote several tangos that enjoyed success, his most successful by far was "Margarita Gauthier" with music by the talented Joaquín Mora. The piece, evoking the character of The Lady of the Camellias, attracted listeners through its deep yet morbid romanticism, but these verses do not hinder the enjoyment of its refined melody. This tango was recorded by Alberto Gómez in 1935, but truly became famous due to the  version of Miguel Caló with Raul Beron, in 1942, which was followed by Aníbal Troilo with Fiorentino, in 1943. Among the various subsequent interpretations can be highlighted Osmar Maderna with Pedro Dátila in 1947, and after the death of Maderna, the purely instrumental version by the Orquesta Símbolo, directed by Aquiles Roggero.

Nelson—the demonic protagonist in the posthumous novel by Leopoldo Marechal "Megafón, o la Guerra"—was also the author of the tangos "Carriego”, “Óyeme, mamá”, “Qué será de ti”, “No debemos retornar”, “Nocturno de tango”, “La casa vacía”, “Escuchando tu voz”, “Al volverte a ver”, “Junto al piano”, “Cuento azul” and “Derrotao”, among others. Nelson did not form a creative duo with any particular composer, creating his tangos with musicians as diverse as the aforementioned Mora, Armando Baliotti, Roberto Nievas Blanco, Jose Garcia, Miguel and Marcos Nijensohn Larrosa, among others. He also had two forays into film, "Historia de un Ídolo" and "Soy del Tiempo de Gardel", about a time which he more than anyone else celebrated.

He was one of a group of prominent Jewish tango musicians, including Szymsia Bajour, Carlos Aguirre, Raúl Kaplún and Ismael Spitalnik.

References 

 Julio Nudler,Tango judío. Del ghetto a la milonga, Editorial Sudamericana, Buenos Aires 1998.
 Ricardo Feierstein, Historia de los judíos argentinos, Editorial Galerna, Buenos Aires, 2006
 Biography
 Historia de un Idolo
 
 Obituary
 Discussion of Jewish Tango Musicians

1913 births
1976 deaths
Jewish Argentine musicians
Argentine tango musicians
Argentine people of Polish-Jewish descent
Musicians from Buenos Aires